The grammar of Modern Greek, as spoken in present-day Greece and Cyprus, is essentially that of Demotic Greek, but it has also assimilated certain elements of Katharevousa, the archaic, learned variety of Greek imitating Classical Greek forms, which used to be the official language of Greece through much of the 19th and 20th centuries. Modern Greek grammar has preserved many features of Ancient Greek, but has also undergone changes in a similar direction as many other modern Indo-European languages, from more synthetic to more analytic structures.

General characteristics

Syntax
The predominant word order in Greek is SVO (subject–verb–object), but word order is quite freely variable, with VSO and other orders as frequent alternatives. Within the noun phrase, adjectives precede the noun (for example, 'the big house'), while possessors generally follow it (for example, 'my house';  'Nick's house'). If there are both an adjective and a possessive, the possessive can be placed before the noun:  ⇔ , 'my big house'. Some other alternative constructions involving the opposite order of constituents are possible as a marked option (e.g.  'the big house';  'Nick's house')

Greek is a pro-drop language, i.e. subjects are typically not overtly expressed whenever they are inferable from context. While the word order of the major elements within the clause is fairly free, certain grammatical elements attach to the verb as clitics and form a rigidly ordered group together with it; this applies particularly to unstressed object pronouns, negation particles, the tense particle  , and the subjunctive particle  . Likewise, possessive pronouns are enclitic to the nouns they modify.

Morphology
Greek is a largely synthetic (inflectional) language. Although the complexity of the inflectional system has been somewhat reduced in comparison to Ancient Greek, there is also a considerable degree of continuity in the morphological system, and Greek still has a somewhat archaic character compared with other Indo-European languages of Europe. Nouns, adjectives and verbs are each divided into several inflectional classes (declension classes and conjugation classes), which have different sets of endings. In the nominals, the ancient inflectional system is well preserved, with the exception of the loss of one case, the dative, and the restructuring of several of the inflectional classes. In the verbal system, the loss of synthetic inflectional categories is somewhat greater, and several new analytic (periphrastic) constructions have evolved instead.

Characteristics of the Balkan language area
Modern Greek shares several syntactic characteristics with its geographical neighbours, with which it forms the so-called Balkan language area (Sprachbund). Among these characteristics are:
The lack of an infinitive. In Greek, verbal complementation in contexts where English would use an infinitive is typically formed with the help of finite (subjunctive) verb forms (e.g. 'I want to go').
The merger of the dative and the genitive case. In Greek, indirect objects are expressed partly through genitive forms of nouns or pronouns, and partly through a periphrasis consisting of the preposition  ('to') and the accusative.
The use of a future construction derived from the verb 'want' (  →  ).
A tendency to use pre-verbal clitic object pronouns redundantly (clitic doubling), doubling an object that is also expressed elsewhere in the clause: for example,  ('I saw it, the car", literally 'It I-saw the car').
On the other hand, one prominent feature of the Balkan language area that Greek does not share is the use of a postposed definite article. The Greek article (like the Ancient Greek one) stands before the noun.

Accent
Modern Greek has a stress accent, similar to English. The former term is taken from one of the accents used in polytonic orthography which officially became obsolete in 1982.

As in Ancient Greek, in Modern Greek the accent cannot be placed before the antepenultimate syllable. As a result, in many words that have the accent on their antepenultimate in their base form, the stress shifts to the next syllable in inflection forms with longer affixes. For example,    ("lesson") but     and     etc. In some words, the accent moves forward even without the addition of a syllable. This accentuation is inherited from Ancient Greek, where long vowels and diphthongs occupied two morae, having the same effect as the addition of a syllable.

Accent shifts can also be triggered by the addition of enclitic elements after a word. Enclitics are phonologically weak personal pronouns that form a single phonological unit together with the word they are attached to. The three-syllable rule then applies to the unit as a whole. When the previous word is accented on the antepenultimate syllable, the enclitic causes the ultimate syllable to be accented too. If two enclitic elements are added to a word, the extra accent appears on the first enclitic. For example,  ("bring it to me").

As a rule, monosyllabic words do not carry an orthographic accent, except for a few words where the accent marker is used to orthographically distinguish them from an otherwise homonymous item (e.g. ("or", distinguished from the feminine article . Moreover, weak personal pronouns are accented in cases where they may be mistaken for enclitics.

Verbs
Greek verb morphology is structured around a basic 2-by-2 contrast of two aspects, namely imperfective and perfective, and two tenses, namely past and non-past (or present). The aspects are expressed by two separate verb stems, while the tenses are marked mainly by different sets of endings. Of the four possible combinations, only three can be used in indicative function: the present (i.e. imperfective non-past), the  imperfect (i.e. imperfective past) and the aorist (i.e. perfective past). All four combinations can be used in subjunctive function, where they are typically preceded by the particle  or by one of a set of subordinating conjunctions. There are also two imperatives, one for each aspect.

In addition to these basic forms, Greek also has several periphrastic verb constructions. Combined with the non-past forms, this creates an imperfective and a perfective future. Combined with the imperfective past it is used as a conditional, and with the perfective past as an inferential. There is also a perfect, which is expressed with an inflected form of the auxiliary verb  ('have'). It occurs both as a past perfect (pluperfect) and as a present perfect.

Modern Greek verbs additionally have three non-finite forms. There is a form traditionally called "απαρέμφατο" (i.e. 'infinitive', literally the 'invariant form'), which is historically derived from the perfective (aorist) infinitive, but has today lost all syntactical functions typically associated with that category. It is used only to form the periphrastic perfect and pluperfect, and is always formally identical to the 3rd person singular of the perfective non-past. There is also a passive participle, typically ending in -menos (-meni, -meno), which is inflected as a regular adjective. Its use is either as a canonical adjective, or as a part of a second, alternative perfect periphrasis with transitive verbs. Finally, there is another invariant form, formed from the present tense and typically ending in -ontas, which is variably called either a participle or a gerund by modern authors. It is historically derived from an old present participle, and its sole use today is to form non-finite adjunct adverbial clauses of time or manner, roughly corresponding to an -ing participle in English.

 Regular perfect periphrasis, with aparemphato ("invariant form"), for example:
  ('I have written the cheque')
 Alternative perfect periphrasis, with passive participle, for example:
  ('I have written the cheque')
 Adverbial clause with present participle/gerund form, for example:
  ('he ran along the street singing')

The tables below exemplify the range of forms with those of one large inflectional class of verbs, the first conjugation.

First conjugation

Second conjugation
Below are the corresponding forms of two subtypes of another class, the second conjugation. Only the basic forms are shown here; the periphrastic combinations are formed as shown above. While the person-number endings are quite regular across all verbs within each of these classes, the formation of the two basic stems for each verb displays a lot of irregularity and can follow any of a large number of idiosyncratic patterns.

Augment
The use of the past tense prefix  (e-), the so-called augment, shows some variation and irregularity between verb classes. In regular (demotic) verbs in standard modern Greek, the prefix is used depending on a stress rule, which specifies that each past tense verb form has its stress on the third syllable from the last (the antepenultimate); the prefix is only inserted whenever the verb would otherwise have fewer than three syllables. A number of frequent verbs have irregular forms involving other vowels, mostly  (i-), for example,  →  ('want'). In addition, verbs from the learned tradition partly preserve more complex patterns inherited from ancient Greek. Where the prefix itself ends in a vowel, the vowels in this position may be subject to further assimilation rules, such as in  →  ('sign'). In addition, verbs whose stem begins in a vowel may also display vocalic changes instead of a syllabic augment, as in  →  ('hope').

Grammatical voice
Greek is one of the few modern Indo-European languages that still retain a morphological contrast between the two inherited Proto-Indo-European grammatical voices: active and mediopassive. The mediopassive has several functions: 
Passive function, denoting an action that is performed on the subject by another agent (for example,  'he was killed');
Reflexive function, denoting an action performed by the subject on him-/herself (for example,  'he shaved himself');
Reciprocal function, denoting an action performed by several subjects on each other (for example,  'they love each other');
Modal function, denoting the possibility of an action (for example,  'it is edible');
Deponential function: verbs that occur only in the mediopassive and lack a corresponding active form. They often have meanings that are rendered as active in other languages:  'Ι work';  'I sleep';  'I accept'. There are also many verbs that have both an active and a mediopassive form but where the mediopassive has a special function that may be rendered with a separate verb in other languages: for example, active  'I raise', passive  'I get up'; active  'I strike', passive  'I am bored'.

There also two other categories of verbs, which historically correspond to the ancient contracted verbs. 

There are also more formal suffixes instead of -μασταν, -σασταν: -μαστε, -σαστε. In this case the suffixes of the first person of the plural of present and imperfect are the same.

Be and have
The forms of both are given below.
The first and second person plural forms ήμαστε and ήσαστε appear very rarely in the spoken language.

For both of these verbs, the older declinable participles are also sometimes used in fossilized stereotypical expressions (e.g. "έχων σωάς τας φρένας", 'of sound mind and spirit')

Nouns
The Greek nominal system displays inflection for two numbers (singular and plural), three genders (masculine, feminine and neuter), and four cases (nominative, genitive, accusative and vocative). As in many other Indo-European languages, the distribution of grammatical gender across nouns is largely arbitrary and need not coincide with natural sex. Case, number and gender are marked on the noun as well as on articles and adjectives modifying it. While there are four cases, there is a great degree of syncretism between case forms within most paradigms. Only one sub-group of the masculine nouns actually has four distinct forms in the four cases.

Articles
There are two articles in Modern Greek, the definite and the indefinite. They are both inflected for gender and case, and the definite article also for number. The article agrees with the noun it modifies. For plural indefiniteness, no article is used.

Definite article
The definite article is used frequently in Greek, such as before proper names and nouns used in an abstract sense. For example,
Ο Αλέξανδρος ήρθε χθες (O Alexandros irthe chthes, "Alexander came yesterday")
Η ειλικρίνεια είναι η καλύτερη πρακτική. (I eilikrineia einai i kalyteri praktiki, "Honesty is the best policy")

Indefinite article
The indefinite article is identical with the numeral one and only has singular forms. The use of the indefinite article is not dictated by rules and the speaker can use it according to the circumstances of their speech. Indefiniteness in plural nouns is expressed by the bare noun without an article, just as in English. For example,
Αγόρασα έναν υπολογιστή (Agorasa enan ypologisti, "I bought a computer")

However, the indefinite article is not used in Greek as often as in English because it specifically expresses the concept of "one". For example,
Είναι δικηγόρος (Einai dikigoros, "He is a lawyer")
Τι καλό παιδί! (Ti kalo paidi, "What a good boy!")

Declensions
Greek nouns are inflected by case and number. In addition each noun belongs to one of three genders: masculine, feminine and neuter. Within each of the three genders, there are several sub-groups (declension classes) with different sets of inflectional endings.

Masculine nouns
The main groups of masculine nouns have the nominative singular end in -ος [-os], -ης [-is], -ας [-as], -έας [-ˈeas]. Nouns in -os are identical to the Ancient Greek second declension, except for the final -n of the accusative singular. However, in other parts of speech that follow the same declension and where clarity is necessary, such as in pronouns, the -n is added. When the word has more than two syllables and the antepenult is accented, the accent fluctuates between the antepenult and the penult according to whether the last syllable has one of the ancient long diphthongs, -ου, -ων or -ους. Nouns in -is correspond to the ancient first declension in most cases, having the accent on the ultimate syllable in the genitive plural, and so do some nouns ending in -ίας [-ˈias].  Nouns in -as stem from the ancient third declension. They formed their nominative singular from the accusative singular and retain the original accent in genitive plural. Nouns in -eas stem from the ancient third declension and form their plural respectively.

Moreover, there are other categories and forms too that have to do with either Demotic or Katharevousa. For example, through Demotic, many nouns, especially oxytones (those that are accented on the last syllable) in -άς (-as) or -ής (-is) form their plural by adding the stem extension -άδ- (-ad-) and -ήδ- (-id-) respectively. Although this declension group is an element of Demotic, it has its roots in Ionic Greek that influenced later Koine. On the other hand, from Katharevousa, nouns such as μυς (mys, "muscle") follow the ancient declension in all cases except for the dative.

Feminine nouns
Most feminine nouns end in -η [-i], -α [-a] and -ος [-os]. Those that end in -i and many that end in -a stem from the ancient first declension and have the accent on the ultimate syllable in genitive plural. The rest of those that end in -a originate from the ancient third declension and have formed their nominative singular from the ancient accusative singular; those nouns keep the accent unchanged in genitive plural. The nouns that end in -ος (-os) are identical to the respective masculine nouns. Finally, many feminine nouns that end in -η (-i) correspond to Ancient Greek nouns in -ις (-is), which are still used as learned forms in formal contexts. Their singular forms have been adapted to the rest of the feminine nouns, while their plural forms have retained the ancient pattern in -εις (-eis). The forms of the genitive singular -εως (-eos) are also found as a stylistic variant and they are fully acceptable, and in fact are more commonly used than the old-style nominative singular form.

Neuter nouns
Most neuter nouns end either in -ο [-o] (plural: -α [-a]) or -ι [-i] (plural: -ιά [-ia]). Indeed, most of them that end in -i initially ended in -io, an ending for diminutives that many nouns acquired already since Koine Greek. As a result, the endings of the plural and of the genitive singular are reminiscent of those older forms. For example, the diminutive of the ancient Greek word παῖς (pais, "child") is παιδίον (paidion) and hence the modern noun παιδί (paidi). Other neuter nouns end in -α (-a) and -ος (-os) and their declension is similar to the ancient one. Moreover, some nouns in -ιμο (-imo), which are usually derivatives of verbs, are declined similarly to those that end in -a. Also note that most borrowings are indeclinable neuter, and can have just about any ending, such as γουίντ-σέρφινγκ "windsurfing". Finally, all neuter nouns have identical forms across the nominative, accusative and vocative.

For other neuter nouns, the ancient declension is used. For example, το φως (fos, "light") becomes του φωτός, τα φώτα and των φώτων and το οξύ (oxy, "acid") becomes του οξέος, τα οξέα and των οξέων.

Adjectives
Adjectives agree with nouns in gender, case and number. Therefore, each adjective has a threefold declension paradigm for the three genders. Adjectives show agreement both when they are used as attributes, e.g. η όμορφη γυναίκα (i omorfi gynaika, "the beautiful woman") and when they are used as predicates e.g. η γυναίκα είναι όμορφη (i gynaika einai omorfi, "the woman is beautiful").

Most adjectives take forms in -ος (-os) in the masculine, -ο (-o) in the neuter and either -η (-i), -α (-a) or -ια (-ia) in the feminine. All those adjectives are declined similarly with the nouns that have the same endings. However they keep the accent stable where nouns change it. Adjectives with a consonant before the ending usually form the feminine with -η, those with a vowel before the ending in -α and some adjectives that end in -κός ([-ˈkos], -kos) or -χός ([-ˈxos], -chos) usually form it in -ια although the ending -η is applicable for those too.

Other classes of adjectives include those that take forms in -ης (-is) in both masculine and feminine and in -ες (-es) in neuter. They are declined similarly with the ancient declension. Those that are not accented on the ultima usually raise the accent in the neuter. Another group includes adjectives that end in -υς ([-is], -ys). Although some are declined somewhat archaically such as οξύς (oxys, "acute"), most of them are declined according to the rules of Demotic Greek and in many cases and persons they acquire other endings, such as in the case of πλατύς (platys, "wide").

The adjective πολύς (polys, "many, much") is irregular:

Comparative and superlative

Adjectives in Modern Greek can form a comparative for expressing comparisons. The periphrastic comparative is formed by the particle πιο ([pço], pio, originally "more") preceding the adjective. The synthetic forms of the regular adjectives in -ος, -η and -o is created with the suffix -ότερος (-'oteros), -ότερη (-'oteri) and -ότερο (-'otero). For those adjectives that end in -ης and -ες or -υς, -εια and -υ the corresponding suffixes are -έστερος (-'esteros) etc. and -ύτερος (-'yteros) etc. respectively.

A superlative is expressed by combining the comparative, in either its periphrastic or synthetic form, with a preceding definite article. Thus, Modern Greek does not distinguish between the largest house and the larger house; both are το μεγαλύτερο σπίτι.

Besides the superlative proper, sometimes called "relative superlative", there is also an "absolute superlative" or elative, expressing the meaning "very...", for example ωραιότατος means very beautiful. Elatives are formed with the suffixes -ότατος, -ότατη and -ότατο for the regular adjectives, -έστατος etc. for those in -ης and -ύτατος for those in -υς.

Numerals
The numerals one, three and four are declined irregularly. Other numerals such as διακόσιοι (diakosioi, "two hundred"), τριακόσιοι (triakosioi, "three hundred") etc. and χίλιοι (chilioi, "thousand") are declined regularly like adjectives. Other numerals including two are not declined.

Pronouns
Greek pronouns include personal pronouns, reflexive pronouns, demonstrative pronouns, interrogative pronouns, possessive pronouns, intensive pronouns, relative pronouns, and indefinite pronouns.

Personal pronouns
There are strong personal pronouns (stressed, free) and weak personal pronouns (unstressed, clitic). Nominative pronouns only have the strong form (except in some minor environments) and are used as subjects only when special emphasis is intended, since unstressed subjects recoverable from context are not overtly expressed anyway. Genitive (possessive) pronouns are used in their weak forms as pre-verbal clitics to express indirect objects (for example, του μίλησα, 'I talked to him'), and as a post-nominal clitic to express possession (for example, οι φίλοι του, 'his friends'). The strong genitive forms are relatively rare and used only for special emphasis (for example, αυτού οι φίλοι, his friends'); often they are doubled by the weak forms (for example, αυτού του μίλησα, ' him I talked to'). An alternative way of giving emphasis to a possessive pronoun is propping it up with the stressed adjective δικός ('own'), for example, οι δικοί του φίλοι ('his friends').

Accusative pronouns exist both in a weak and a strong form. The weak form in the oblique cases is used as a pre-verbal clitic (for example, τον είδα, 'I saw him'); the strong form is used elsewhere in the clause (for example, είδα αυτόν, 'I saw him'). The weak form in the nominative is found only in few idiomatic deictic expressions, such as να τος 'there he [is]', πού 'ν' τος; 'where is he?'. Third-person pronouns have separate forms for the three genders; those of the first and second person do not. The weak third-person forms are similar to the corresponding forms of the definite article. The strong third-person forms function simultaneously as generic demonstratives ('this, that').

In the plural, there exists the alternative accusative form αυτουνούς.

Besides αυτός  as a generic demonstrative, there are also the more specific spatial demonstrative pronouns τούτος, -η, -ο ('this here') and εκείνος, -η, -ο ('that there').

It is worth noting that in some rare cases, pronouns in the genitive can either express an indirect object or a possessive, as they have the same form (μου, σου, του, ...). In the case of possible ambiguity, a diacritical accent should be written if the pronoun is an indirect object (μού, σού, τού, ...).

- Indirect object: Ο καθηγητής μού εξήγησε το μάθημα. (The teacher explained the lesson to me.)

- Possessive: Ο καθηγητής μου εξήγησε το μάθημα. (My teacher explained the lesson.)

- Both: Ο καθηγητής μου μου εξήγησε το μάθημα. (My teacher explained the lesson to me.)

The last sentence does not require diacritics, as one of the "μου" represents the possessive, and the other one represents the indirect object.

In speech, the ambiguity would be removed by a stronger emphasis of 'μου' if it is an indirect object, the possessive being unstressed anyway.

Prepositions
In Demotic Greek, prepositions normally require the accusative case: από (from), για (for), με (with), μετά (after), χωρίς (without), ως (as) and σε (to, in or at). The preposition σε, when followed by a definite article, fuses with it into forms like στο (σε + το) and στη (σε + τη). While there is only a relatively small number of simple prepositions native to Demotic, the two most basic prepositions σε and από can enter into a large number of combinations with preceding adverbs to form new compound prepositions, for example, πάνω σε (on), κάτω από (underneath), πλάι σε (beside), πάνω από (over) etc.

A few prepositions that take cases other than the accusative have been borrowed into Standard Modern Greek from the learned tradition of Katharevousa: κατά (against), υπέρ (in favor of, for), αντί (instead of). Other prepositions live on in a fossilised form in certain fixed expressions (for example, εν τω μεταξύ 'in the meantime', dative).

The preposition από (apó, 'from') is also used to express the agent in passive sentences, like English by.

Conjunctions
Coordinating and subordinating conjunctions in Greek include:

The word να serves as a generic subordinator corresponding roughly to English to (+ infinitive) or that in sentences like προτιμώ να πάω ('I prefer to go', literally 'I prefer that I go') or προτιμώ να πάει ο Γιάννης ('I prefer that John go'). It marks the following verb as being in the subjunctive mood. Somewhat similar to the English to-infinitive its use is often associated with meanings of non-factuality, i.e. events that have not (yet) come true, that are expected, wished for etc. In this, it contrasts with ότι  and πως , which correspond to English that when used with a meaning of factuality. The difference can be seen in the contrast between μας είπε να πάμε βόλτα ('he told us to go for a walk') vs. μας είπε πως πήγε βόλτα ('he told us that he went for a walk'). When used on its own with a following verb, να may express a wish or order, as in να πάει! ('let him go' or 'may he go'). Unlike the other subordinating conjunctions, να is always immediately followed by the verb it governs, separated from it only by any clitics that might be attached to the verb, but not by a subject or other clause-initial material.

Negation
For sentence negation, Greek has two distinct negation particles, δε(ν) ([ˈðe(n)], de(n)) and μη(ν) ([ˈmi(n)], mi(n)). Δεν is used  in clauses with indicative mood, while μην is used primarily in subjunctive contexts, either after subjunctive-inducing να or as a negative replacement for να. Both particles are syntactically part of the proclitic group in front of the verb, and can be separated from the verb only by intervening clitic pronouns. The distinction between δεν and μην is a particularly archaic feature in Greek, continuing an old prohibitive negation marker inherited from Indo-European. As such, μην is often associated with the expression of a wish for an event not to come true:

Δεν του ζήτησα να έρθει. (Den tou zitisa na erthei, "I didn't ask him to come.")
Του ζήτησα να μην έρθει. (Tou zitisa na min erthei, "I asked him not to come.")

When used alone with a subjunctive verb in the second person, prohibitive μην serves as the functional equivalent to a negative imperative, which itself cannot be negated. Thus, the negation of the positive imperative τρέξε ('run!') is μην τρέξεις ('don't run!').

The particle όχι serves as the stand-alone utterance of negation ('no'), and also for negation of elliptical, verbless sentences and for contrastive negation of individual constituents:

Κάλεσα τη Μαρία, όχι τον Γιώργο. (Kalesa ti Maria, ochi' ton Giorgo, "I invited Mary, not George.")

For constituent negation, Greek employs negative concord. The negated constituent is marked with a negative-polarity item (e.g. κανένας 'any, anybody/nobody', τίποτα 'anything/nothing', πουθενά 'anywhere/nowhere'), and the verb is additionally marked with the sentence negator δεν (or μην). In verbless, elliptical contexts the negative-polarity items can also serve to express negation alone.

The negative pronoun κανείς ([kaˈnis], kaneis), i.e. nobody or anybody is declined in all three genders and three cases and can be used as the English determiner no.

Δε θέλω κανέναν εδώ. (De thelo kanenan edo, "I want nobody here.")
—Είναι κανείς εδώ; —Όχι, κανείς. (—Einai kaneis edo? —Ochi, kaneis, "'Is anyone here?' 'No, nobody.'")
Δεν έκανα κανένα λάθος. (Den ekana kanena lathos, "I have made no mistake.")

On the other hand, the negative pronoun ουδείς ([uˈðis], oudeis), from the learned tradition of Ancient Greek, is used without negative concord:
Ουδείς πείστηκε. (Oudeis peistike, "No one was convinced.")

Relative clauses
Greek has two different ways of forming relative clauses. The simpler and by far the more frequent uses the invariable relativizer που ('that', literally 'where'), as in: η γυναίκα που είδα χτες ('the woman that I saw yesterday'). When the relativized element is a subject, object or adverbial within the relative clause, then – as in English – it has no other overt expression within the relative clause apart from the relativizer. Some other types of relativized elements, however, such as possessors, are represented within the clause by a resumptive pronoun, as in: η γυναίκα που βρήκα την τσάντα της ('the woman whose handbag I found', literally 'the woman that I found her handbag').

The second and more formal form of relative clauses employs complex inflected relative pronouns. They are composite elements consisting of the definite article and a following pronominal element that is inflected like an adjective: ο οποίος, η οποία, το οποίο ( etc., literally 'the which'). Both elements are inflected for case, number and gender according to the grammatical properties of the relativized item within the relative clause, as in: η γυναίκα την οποία είδα χτες ('the woman whom I saw yesterday'); η γυναίκα της οποίας βρήκα την τσάντα ('the woman whose handbag I found').

Notes

References

Bibliography
Hardy, D. A. and Doyle, T. A. Greek language and people, BBC Books, 1996. .

 [Greek translation of Holton, Mackridge and Philippaki-Warburton 1997]
 [abridged version of Holton, Mackridge and Philippaki-Warburton 1997]

 Lindstedt, J. 1999. "On the Nature of Linguistic Balkanisms". Paper read at the Eighth International Congress of the International Association of Southeast European Studies (AIESEE), Bucharest 24–28 August 1999.
Marineta, D. and Papacheimona, D., Ελληνικά Τώρα, Nostos, 1992. .
Pappageotes, G. C. and Emmanuel, P. D., Modern Greek in a Nutshell, Institute for Language Study, Montclair, N.J. 07042, Funk and Wagnalls, New York, 1958; "Vest Pocket Modern Greek", Owlets, 1990, .
Pring, J. T. The Pocket Oxford Greek Dictionary, Oxford University Press, 2000. .

Greek grammar
Grammar
Grammar